Beth Kaplan (born August 1, 1950) is a Canadian writer, teacher, and actor.

Early life

Kaplan began her professional acting career in 1970, with a school touring production for Toronto's Young People's Theatre. She worked for a decade as an actor, primarily in Vancouver. She appeared in nine tours, including one national tour. She left the stage in 1980 to earn an MFA in creative writing at the University of British Columbia.

She has taught personal essay and memoir writing at Toronto Metropolitan University (previously Ryerson University) since 1994 and also at the University of Toronto since 2007, wherein 2012 she won U of T's Excellence in Teaching Award. A fellow of the Banff Centre's Literary Journalism program, she produces So True, a twice-yearly reading series for her long-term students and herself, at the Black Swan in Toronto. A board and conference committee member of the Creative Nonfiction Collective, she gave a master class at a recent conference entitled "The Writer as Performer."

Career

Through the nineties, Kaplan had scores of essays published in newspapers and magazines and on CBC radio. Her first book,Finding the Jewish Shakespeare: The Life and Legacy of Jacob Gordin, a biography of her great-grandfather, was published in 2006 and reissued in paperback in 2012. It was called "a witty, shrewd, elegant book which tells a story of vital importance" by Tony Kushner. She spoke about the book across Canada, four times in New York including at the 92nd Street Y, in other American cities, in French in Paris, and at Oxford University. In 2008 she delivered the annual Wexler Lecture in Jewish History in Washington, D.C.

Her memoir All My Loving: Coming of Age with Paul McCartney in Paris, and her textbook on creative writing True to Life: 50 Steps to Help You Tell Your Story, appeared in 2014.

Her memoir Loose Woman, published in 2020, is the story of her fraught years as an actress through the seventies and particularly the year 1979, when living and working with men with disabilities in France changed her life.

Personal life
Kaplan is the great-granddaughter of the Yiddish playwright Jacob Gordin, the daughter of Canadian scientist and activist Dr. J. Gordin Kaplan, and the niece of the American bridge champion, Edgar Kaplan.

References

External links
 Official website
 Twitter

1950 births
Living people
Canadian memoirists
Canadian women memoirists
Canadian stage actresses
University of British Columbia alumni
21st-century Canadian women writers
Canadian biographers
Women biographers
20th-century Canadian actresses
University of Toronto alumni
Writers from Vancouver
Academic staff of Toronto Metropolitan University
Writers from New York City
Actresses from New York City
21st-century American women writers
20th-century American actresses
American stage actresses
21st-century memoirists
American women academics